Henry Effingham Eccles (born in Bayside, New York, on December 31, 1898 - died May 14, 1986 in Needham, Massachusetts) was a Rear Admiral in the United States Navy and  a major figure at the Naval War College in Newport, Rhode Island from the late 1940s through the 1970s, as a thinker and writer on naval logistics and military theory.

Early life and education
The son of an Episcopal priest, the Reverend George Warrington Eccles, and his wife Lydia Lawrence, he was initially educated privately at home by his parents and later sent to Trinity School in New York City, before enrolling as an undergraduate at Columbia University. After one year at Columbia, he entered the U.S. Naval Academy, graduating with the class of 1922.

Naval career
After his first assignments to battleships, Eccles attended Submarine School and served in two submarines before being ordered to Columbia University, where he earned a Master of Science degree in mechanical engineering in 1930. He commanded two submarines, then served as Engineer and Repair Officer at the Submarine Base at New London, Connecticut; then served for nearly three years as engineer in the heavy cruiser  and two years in the Design Construction Division of the Bureau of Engineering in the Navy Department, Washington, D.C. In 1940, he was ordered to command the destroyer  on the Asiatic Station, based in the Philippines.  He was in command when the Japanese simultaneously attacked Pearl Harbor as well as American and British positions in Southeast Asia on December 7, 1941.  He and his ship participated in the battle of Badung Strait, and shortly after, while assigned to the American-British-Dutch-Australian Command (ABDA), the battle of the Java Sea. Wounded in action, Eccles was later awarded the Navy Cross, the Silver Star, and The Netherlands Order of the Bronze Lion.

After recovering from his wounds, Eccles served in the Base Maintenance Division in the Office of the Chief of Naval Operations in 1942-43, where he helped to coordinate logistics planning for all advanced bases. After attending the command course at the Naval War College, he was promoted to captain and assigned for the final two years of the war to be the Director of the Advance Base Section, Service Force at the headquarters of the U.S. Pacific Fleet in Hawaii.  In this key position, Eccles coordinated the planning, construction, and support of advance bases in the Central Pacific, a critical aspect of the American island-hopping strategy in the war against Japan.  For his service in this capacity, he received the Legion of Merit.

Immediately after the conclusion of the war, the Navy Department assigned Eccles to the Joint Operations Review Board, a group of officers from all services assigned to evaluate joint operations during World War II.  From that posting, he went on to command the battleship . In 1947, the President of the Naval War College, then Admiral Raymond A. Spruance, selected Eccles to be the first Chairman of the College’s newly established Logistics Department, an area that Spruance and others felt had been neglected in professional naval thinking during the period between the two world wars.  While in that position from 1947 to 1951, Eccles wrote his first book, Operational Naval Logistics (1950), a manual for the United States Navy that was a pioneering work on the fundamentals of his subject.  He left the Naval War College in 1951 with orders to be Assistant Chief of Staff for Logistics to the Commander-in-Chief, U.S. Naval Forces, Eastern Atlantic and Mediterranean (CINCNELM) with headquarters in London and, simultaneously, Assistant Chief of Staff for Logistics, to NATO’s Commander-in-Chief, Allied Forces Southern Europe (CINCSOUTH), with headquarters in Naples, Italy.

Retirement Years
Eccles retired from active duty in the Navy on June 30, 1952 and was promoted to rear admiral on the retired list. Returning to his home in Newport, Rhode Island, he was closely associated with the Naval War College, where he served unofficially as a confidante and advisor to successive presidents of the College as well as an instructor for elective courses on military theory, principles of logistics, and international relations.  During this period, he was also a stimulating force for the Naval War College faculty and wrote several major works. When he left Newport in 1985 to enter a retirement home in Needham, Massachusetts, the Naval War College honored him by naming its library in his honor. Henry Eccles died in Needham a year later on May 14, 1986.

Awards

Published works
Operational Naval Logistics (1950)
Logistics in the National Defense (1959, 1981, 1997)
Military Concepts and Philosophy (1965)
Military Power in a Free Society (1979)

References

 Eveleyn Cherpak, Register of the Henry E. Eccles Papers (Newport: Naval War College, Naval Historical Collection, 1988)

External links
Oral History by Rear Admiral Henry E. Eccles
Reminiscences of Mrs Isabel Eccles

  To the Java Sea: Selections from the Diary, Letters, and Reports of Henry E. Eccles, 1940-42

1898 births
1986 deaths
People from Queens, New York
United States Naval Academy alumni
Naval War College alumni
Naval War College faculty
United States Navy rear admirals
Recipients of the Navy Cross (United States)
Recipients of the Silver Star
Recipients of the Legion of Merit
Recipients of the Bronze Lion